Yakutat Army Airfield is a former United States Army airfield located three nautical miles (6 km) southeast of the central business district of Yakutat, a city and borough in the U.S. state of Alaska which has no road access to the outside world. After its closure, it was redeveloped into Yakutat Airport.

History 
Yakutat Army Airfield was constructed as part of the United States Army's long-range defense program for Alaska.  During World War II the airfield was a key USAAF base during the Aleutian Campaign.  It was used in combat by the 406th Bombardment Squadron (June–November 1942) (28th Bombardment Group).

See also 

 Alaska World War II Army Airfields
 List of airports in Alaska

References

Other sources 

 
 Maurer, Maurer (1983). Air Force Combat Units Of World War II. Maxwell AFB, Alabama: Office of Air Force History. .
 Maurer, Maurer (1969), Combat Squadrons of the Air Force, World War II, Air Force Historical Studies Office, Maxwell AFB, Alabama.

External links
 Topographic map from USGS The National Map

Airfields of the United States Army Air Forces in Alaska
Installations of the United States Army in Alaska